This is a list of characters from , a Japanese tokusatsu drama and the 38th entry in the Super Sentai franchise.

Main characters

ToQgers
The  are five children who the Rainbow Line recruited for their  and aged up to young adults to stop the Shadow Line from plunging the world into darkness, though they initially lack memories of their past and how they came to be recruited. As the series progresses, the ToQgers eventually learn their imagination saved them when the Shadow Line took over their hometown, when Emperor Z took notice of Right's inner light. Though Right ended up on a Cryner due to his encounter with Z while his friends were brought to the Rainbow Line, they work together to defeat the Shadow Line, recover their memories, and return home, even at the potential cost of remaining trapped in their adult forms and being forgotten by their loved ones. Along the way, they are joined by a Shadow Creep who seeks to repent for his sins by dying in battle. Ultimately, the ToQgers succeed in freeing and returning to Subarugahama and are returned to their original ages.

While each member has a primary ToQ Ressha with an associated color and weapon, they can also swap them with each other via .

Right
Out of the five ToQgers, Right's Imagination is the strongest, as he inspires others to believe in what he believes in, often pulling his friends along whether they like it or not. He often acts before he thinks and hates cramped places. Additionally, he is initially the only ToQger with any form of memory of their pasts. In combat, he has a habit of initiating Transfer Changes without asking for permission, often annoying his friends and the Conductor.

Later in the series, it is revealed he lives with his grandfather , mother , younger sister , and younger brother , and was accidentally infused with Emperor Z's darkness when Subarugahama was consumed by darkness. This resulted in Right ending up in a Cryner instead of the Rainbow Line when the ToQgers were recruited and gradually lose his imagination. Nevertheless, with help from his friends and mother, Right regains his imagination and safely returns to Subarugahama with them.

As , normally colored red, Right wields the  sword. With the Hyper Ressha, he can transform into . During his final battle with Z, Right uses the Hyper Ressha and his teammates' ToQ Ressha to transform into the multicolored .

Tokatti
While he is the type that wants to investigate and research first and specializes in analyzing enemies and making plans, he tends to be flighty, overreact to everything, and becomes incessant in regards to results. Additionally, he has trouble with being punctual, thinking on the fly, and improvising due to his deliberate thought processes. Despite these traits, his friends view him as the smartest member of the group, though he personally believes Hikari is smarter than him.

As , normally colored blue, Tokatti wields the  laser gun. With the Hyper Ressha, he can transform into .

Mio
 is a sporty, tomboyish youth and the daughter of a police officer father named  who instinctively cares for others and displays no tolerance for underhanded tactics while hiding the more delicate and romantic aspects of her personality, the latter especially due to being uncomfortable with the idea of romance. Because of this, she is quite popular with the boys and acts as the team's big sister.

With the Hyper Ressha, she can transform into .

Hikari
 is an unhurried, quick-witted, and calm youth who often sits alone while his friends are occupied with other matters and serves as Right's foil due to the former's natural fighting instincts, analytical nature, and differing imagination and opinions. Unsociable and unwilling to talk much, Hikari keeps everyone grounded when Right pulls them away and shows loyalty to Mio and a tendency to tease Kagura. Additionally, despite Tokatti's belief that Hikari is the smartest member of the team, the latter does not display this side often. Later in the series, it is revealed that Hikari lives with his grandmother  since his mother  is busy.

With the Hyper Ressha, he can transform into .

Kagura

With the Hyper Ressha, she can transform into .

Akira Nijino
 is a Rainbow Line railway worker who was originally Shadow Line member and General Schwarz's comrade, . Possessing the power to cause rain, Zaram believed he was capable of great evil until he saw a rainbow, which inspired him to defect to the Rainbow Line and atone for his perceived sins by finding a place worth dying for his newfound cause. Despite renouncing his origins, his power remained.

When the ToQgers learn the Conductor acquired equipment for a sixth ToQger and following an encounter with him, Right chooses Zaram to join them despite learning of his past. Zaram is initially reluctant before eventually being convinced to do so as part of his quest for redemption. Despite this and receiving a human name, Akira does not truly see himself as a ToQger, which leads to him secretly joining forces with a rogue Schwarz to stop Emperor Z and temporarily fighting against the ToQgers. Following Schwarz's death, Akira returns to them after learning that they cherish their friendship with him. As of the V-Cinema They Went and Came Back Again Ressha Sentai ToQger: Super ToQ 7gou of Dreams, Akira discovers his time with the Rainbow Line is gradually making him human.

Unlike the other ToQgers, Akira utilizes the  smartphone in order to transform into the orange-colored  and is unable to perform Transfer Changes due to his increased power compared to the primary members. While transformed, he wields the  baton, which he can use in conjunction with the Drill Ressha to perform an unnamed finisher. With the Hyper Ressha, he can transform into . During the events of the DVD special, Ressha Sentai ToQger DVD Special: Farewell, Ticket! The Wasteland Super ToQ Battle!!, Akira acquires the Build Ressha Super ToQ Version, which allows him to transform into the brightly-colored .

Ressha
The  are the ToQgers' headquarters, which are based on the Rainbow Line. Though they usually answer to the Conductor, the Ressha can be used by the ToQgers to combine together into mecha via  and fight enlarged Shadow Creeps.

: Right's personal steam locomotive/passenger train-themed Ressha that serves as the ToQgers' primary headquarters.
: Tokatti's personal Shinkansen-themed Ressha.
: Mio's personal E65-themed Ressha.
: Hikari's personal Shinkansen-themed Ressha.
: Kagura's personal E65-themed Ressha.
: A series of supplementary Ressha that can combine with the ToQgers' mecha via .
: A Ressha capable of combining with ToQ-Oh in its  mode, in which it can perform the  attack.
: An autorack-themed Ressha capable of carrying large items and the tiny .
: A tank car-themed Ressha that refuels the other Ressha.
Due to the latter trait, the Shadow Line's mecha can also combine with the Drill Ressha.
: A form that the Kyoryu Red's Zyudenryu partner, Gabutyra, takes on during the events of the crossover film Heisei Rider vs. Shōwa Rider: Kamen Rider Taisen feat. Super Sentai.
: A series of animal-themed Ressha that operate on the Galaxy Line, normally answer to Lady, though the ToQgers are able to pilot them as well, and appear exclusively in the film Ressha Sentai ToQger the Movie: Galaxy Line S.O.S.
: A namesake/steam locomotive-themed Ressha.
: A namesake/Shinkansen-themed Ressha.
: A namesake/commuter rail-themed Ressha.
: A namesake/Shinkansen-themed Ressha.
: A namesake/commuter rail-themed Ressha.
Though it usually answers to the President, the Ressha can be used by Hyper ToQ 1gou.

Ressha Combinations
: The combined form of the ToQgers' primary Ressha that is armed with the crossing gate-themed  sword, which has a Sword Mode for performing the  finisher and a Gun Mode for performing the  finisher. With SafariGaOh, ToQ-Oh can perform the  finisher.
: The combination of ToQ-Oh and the Shield Ressha that possesses increased defensive capabilities and access to the latter's attacks.
: The combination of ToQ-Oh and the Car Carrier Ressha that can perform the  finisher.
: The combination of ToQ-Oh and the Tank Ressha that grants increased punching capabilities and can perform the  finisher.
: The combination of ToQ-Oh and the Car Carrier and Tank Resshas that can perform the  finisher.
: The combination of ToQ-Oh and the Police Ressha that can perform the  finisher.
: The combination of ToQ-Oh and the Drill Ressha that can perform the  finisher.
: The combination of ToQ-Oh, the Kyoryuger Ressha, and Kamen Rider Den-O's DenLiner that is armed with Kyoryuzin's Goren Zyudenken and can perform the  finisher. This combination appears exclusively in the crossover film Heisei Rider vs. Shōwa Rider: Kamen Rider Taisen feat. Super Sentai.
: The combination of ToQ-Oh and two of the Build Ressha's front cars that can perform the  finisher.
: The combination of the Diesel, Car Carrier, and Tank Resshas that possesses incredible strength and can perform the  attack and the  finisher.
: The combination of DieselOh and the Fire Ressha that can perform the  finisher.
: The combination of DieselOh and the Police and Fire Resshas that produce .
: The  of ToQ-Oh and DieselOh that is equipped with the arm-mounted , with which it can perform the  finisher.
: The combination of Cho ToQ-Oh and the Fire Ressha that can perform the  finisher.
: The combination of Cho ToQ-Oh and the Police Ressha that can perform the  finisher.
: The combination of Cho ToQ-Oh and the Police and Shield Resshas.
: The combination of Cho ToQ-Oh and the Police and Fire Resshas that can perform the  finisher.
: The combination of Build DaiOh and the Drill Ressha that can perform the  finisher.
: The combination of Build DaiOh and the Tank Ressha.
: The  of ToQ-Oh, DieselOh, and Build DaiOh that is armed with the chest-mounted  and the  lance and can perform the  finisher.

Recurring characters

Rainbow Line

Conductor
The  is an eccentric and enigmatic train conductor for the Rainbow Line who possesses knowledge of the ToQgers' past, which he withholds from the group. As of the V-Cinema Ressha Sentai ToQger Returns: Super ToQ 7gou of Dreams, he has been promoted to commander of the Rainbow Line's railroad police force, was renamed  as such, and became the violet-colored .

As ToQ 7gou, the Conductor uses the Applichanger and a Build Ressha-like ToQ Ressha to transform and is armed with a ToQ Blaster. With the Hyper Ressha, ToQ 7gou can transform into .

Ticket
 is the Conductor's sharp-tongued and straightforward monkey-like hand puppet, though the former dislikes being called as such. During the events of Ressha Sentai ToQger DVD Special: Farewell, Ticket! The Wasteland Super ToQ Battle!!, it is revealed Ticket previously used the Applichanger before it was given to Akira. Additionally, the former temporarily transfers himself to Akira's hand so he can use the Applichanger to become  and settle a rivalry with his nemesis, Kaniros, who killed Ticket's girlfriend Jennifer in the past. As of They Went and Came Back Again Ressha Sentai ToQGer: Super ToQ 7gou of Dreams, Ticket is now worn by Wagon.

Wagon
 is a robotic assistant who sells drinks and meals to the ToQgers and performs maintenance and chores on the Ressha. Though mysterious, she has a knack for putting a smile on everyone's faces despite her ditzy personality. As of They Went and Came Back Again Ressha Sentai ToQger Returns: Super ToQ 7gou of Dreams, Wagon has taken over the Conductor's duties after he becomes ToQ 7gou.

President
The  is a man who appears to be wearing a rabbit-themed mascot head in the same vein that Ticket appears to be a monkey-themed puppet and directs all actions on the Rainbow Line, having used his powers to transform the ToQgers into adults in order to help them resist the power of darkness while retaining their imagination.

Shadow Line
To achieve their goal, the group's acting leaders send Shadow Ressha called  and/or Shadow Creeps to establish  to gradually convert the surrounding cities into  and absorb them into the Shadow Line's world, erasing all memory of the original town in the process. The acting leaders initially gather darkness to give their leader, Emperor Z, entry into the world, before shifting their focus towards spreading darkness around the world to make it a utopia for them.

All Cryners are capable of changing into a humanoid  form, which is armed with twin forearm-mounted cannons, with the Shadow Line's leaders each possessing a unique model.

Baron Nero
 is the acting leader of the Shadow Line in Emperor Z's absence whose Shadow Creeps serve him by targeting multiple stations at once to gather enough darkness to bring Z into the human world, with some directly participating in Nero's various schemes. Despite learning of Z's obsession with light, Nero remains loyal to his leader, believing the obsession to be a phase before resolving to help him consume the world's light amidst verbal abuse from Marchioness Mork. During the Darkness Decline, Nero pilots a Cho-Cryner Robo to protect Castle Terminal from the ToQgers before his mecha is destroyed by Build DaiOh. After being mortally wounded by ToQ 6gou in a duel, Nero sacrifices himself to heal Z's injuries.

Madame Noir
 is the secondary leader of the Shadow Line whose Shadow Creeps focus on gathering high-quality darkness to refine her daughter, Miss Glitta's, beauty and prepare her for her upcoming wedding to Emperor Z to secretly gain the throne through her. After Z absorbs Glitta and thwarts her attempt on his life however, Noir is forced to submit to him. When Marchioness Mork moves into Castle Terminal, Noir tries to prove herself by using her  to turn citizens into berserkers. While the plan fails, she learns Glitta is still alive inside Z and bides her time by using less capable Shadow Creeps to gather minimal amounts of darkness until she can free her. After freeing Boseki Shadow during the Darkness Decline, Noir is shocked to learn Glitta does not want to leave Z, who blasts Noir out of Castle Terminal. Grievously injured, she joins forces with General Schwarz and ToQ 6gou to free Glitta before Noir is killed by Z.

General Schwarz
 is the Shadow Line's military leader who is obsessed with building the Shadow Ressha forces to deal with the ToQgers once he obtains enough intelligence on them and a former friend of Akira Nijino's. Additionally, Schwarz is aware of Miss Glitta's feelings for him, promising to tell her at a later time. Before he can do so, Emperor Z absorbs her during their wedding and knocks Schwarz into a nearby river, where the latter is presumed dead and secretly vows revenge. In pursuit of his goal, Schwarz tricks the ToQgers into forming an alliance with him so he can steal the Drill Ressha, only to learn Glitta is still alive within Z's body. After being confronted by Nijino, Schwarz agrees to return the Drill Ressha in exchange for the former's services during the Darkness Decline. Despite rescuing Glitta, Schwarz learns too late that he endangered her further and sends her away in his personal Cryner while he attempts to fight Z-Shin, only to suffer fatal injuries. Before he dies, Schwarz taunts the emperor with the fact that the former had found his own light before he did.

Additionally, his personal Cryner Robo is armed with twin forearm-mounted spikes and a sword.

Miss Glitta
 is Madame Noir's daughter who is being brought up to become a bride for Emperor Z once he enters the world, though Glitta is secretly infatuated with General Schwarz after receiving a  that he dropped and said she could keep. Upon meeting Z, she finds him frightening and forms a secret alliance with Schwarz in a failed attempt to evade the wedding. Becoming more mature as a result of Z influencing her actions, Glitta helps Schwarz attack the ToQgers, leading to her taking a fatal blow meant for him. As he attends to her well-being, she expresses her feelings for him, only to be absorbed from the inside by Z for her inner light. Though presumed dead, Glitta is later revealed to still be alive, functioning as a hindrance to his full potential. Amidst the Darkness Decline, she gradually begins to take over his body before eventually being freed by Noir and Schwarz, only to watch them die in front of her after he sends her away in his personal Cryner for her own safety. Intent on saving Z from himself and averting further deaths, she seeks out the ToQgers' help in covering her while she takes over Castle Terminal's controls and move it towards the dark depths. She later takes the incorporeal Z back to the Shadow Line. 

During the events of the V-Cinema They Went and Came Back Again Ressha Sentai ToQger: Super ToQ 7gou of Dreams, Glitta unknowingly creates a time paradox that allows the ToQgers to defeat Archduke Hei.

Emperor Z
 is the human-like ruler of the Shadow Line who embodies the purest form of darkness and was responsible for dragging Subarugahama into the developing Shadow Line. Ironically, he develops an unhealthy obsession with light due to coming into contact with Right after being attracted to Subarugahama's festival lights, which reflects in his Shadow Creeps' unique ability to produce light or possession of a glittering quality. Due to initially lacking a full physical presence in the human world, he tasks his followers with gathering darkness from human hearts to expand the Shadow Line under the belief that those he deems loyal and valuable will be spared. Upon his arrival from the World of Darkness, he recognizes the ToQgers as the children who escaped Subarugahama, develops an interest in Right, and reveals himself to him, though Z is unable to remain in the light for extended periods of time.

After allowing Miss Glitta to absorb him before eventually absorbing her in turn to obtain her "light" and remove his weakness, he intends to take the ToQgers' light next. However, he discovers that he could not fully absorb Glitta due to her keeping his full power in check, resulting in him assuming a flawed version of his monstrous true form and becoming a moody loose cannon. Amidst the Darkness Decline and while fighting General Schwarz and ToQ 6gou, Z briefly loses control over Glitta, who tries to warn the ToQgers not to free her. However, Schwarz and Noir do so, unknowingly allowing Z to achieve his full potential and his true form,  before killing Noir and Schwarz. Accepting he can never have the light as his own, Z learns part of his being entered Right's body. This combined with learning Glitta was taking pity on him convinces Z to mount an assault on the world and drown it in darkness, destroying any remaining light, while sparing Right long enough to see the Dark Behemoth consume everything in its path. After the Dark Behemoth is destroyed and he is mortally wounded by the ToQgers, Z absorbs his remaining followers to heal his injures and increase his power before he is defeated by Right as Rainbow ToQ 1gou. Seeing a rainbow before he explodes in a storm of darkness, Glitta retrieves Z's essence and takes him back to the Shadow Line to re-constitute himself in peace.

While fighting Schwarz and ToQ 6gou, Z steals the latter's transformation equipment and briefly becomes .

Marchioness Mork
 is the oldest member of the Shadow Line who personally raised Emperor Z, resulting in her behaving informally around him despite their status, and was originally in charge of overseeing Shadow Towns via her Keepers before moving into Castle Terminal due to Z's obsession with light and to quell sedition among their ranks. Mork continues to loyally serve Z before eventually allowing him to absorb her to heal his injuries.

Additionally, her personal Cryner Robo mode is armed with a larger version of her Marchioness Mic Rod and train horns on its shoulders capable of firing supersonic beams.

Close
The  are train robber-themed foot soldiers who support the Shadow Creeps, are armed with Tommy guns that can transform into hatchet-like weapons, and pilot Cryners.

Shadow Creeps
The  are the Shadow Line's monstrous front line warriors whose primary purpose is to establish Dark Stations in a city to propagate the darkness within its citizens' hearts and extend the Shadow Line's railway. If they are defeated in their human size, they can use the darkness that they have gathered to enlarge themselves to giant size. If they are killed regardless of what size they are, their Dark Station and its connected city are restored to their original states.
At the  Dark Station, he kidnaps children with high imagination to make them cry and increase the length of his Cryner's railway. However, he inadvertently kidnaps ToQ 1gou, which alerts the other ToQgers to the Shadow Creep's position. After being defeated by ToQ 1gou and enlarging himself, Bag Shadow is killed by ToQ-Oh.
Displaying an obsession with dueling and zero tolerance for cowards, Sabre Shadow converted the  Station into the  Dark Station and forces its citizens to duel during a particular time of the day. After losing to ToQ 1gou in a duel, Sabre Shadow enlarges himself, but is killed by ToQ-Oh in another duel.
After Noir sends him to convert the  Station into the  Dark Station, he captures Kagura after she is accidentally abandoned by her teammates, but her indomitable spirit keeps her from giving up and helps her destroy the coffin. After being defeated by the ToQgers and enlarging himself, Chain Shadow is killed by ToQ-Oh.
: A childish namesake-themed Shadow Creep and servant of Miss Glitta's who is armed with a stomach furnace capable of firing . She sends him to secretly help General Schwarz and use the  Dark Station to inflict pain and steal imagination. After being defeated by the ToQgers and enlarging himself, Stove Shadow is killed by ToQ-Oh Shield.
After ToQ 1gou is unintentionally separated from his teammates and inadvertently eats the last of a group of campers' food, he catches and cooks fish for them, luring Baketsu Shadow to him. After being defeated by the ToQgers and enlarging himself, Baketsu Shadow is killed by ToQ-Oh Car Carrier, which reverts the Dark Station to the  Station.
From his base at the  Dark Station, he makes everyone lose their motivation and hinders the ToQgers' attempts to stop him until ToQ 4gou and 5gou find a way to destroy Hanko Shadow's Stamp Gloves from a distance and restore his victims. Hanko Shadow enlarges himself, but is killed by ToQ-Oh Car Carrier.
Nero sends him to distract the ToQgers from interfering in another of the latter's underlings' schemes. Bakudan Shadow attempts to send the ToQgers' Ressha careening into an oil refinery and place a bomb on Tokatti. However, Hikari borrows his friend's ToQ Ressha to trick the Shadow Creep into believing Tokatti freed himself. After being thrown out of the Ressha, Bakudan Shadow enlarges himself before he is killed by the primary Ressha and Diesel Ressha.
Nero sends him to convert the  Station into the  Dark Station by turning men into his puppets and have women fall in love with them before immediately breaking their hearts so he can absorb the women's darkness. After being defeated by the ToQgers and enlarging himself, Marionette Shadow is killed by DieselOh.
She sends him to collect darkness in preparation for Emperor Z's eventual arrival. Despite sending the ToQgers' Ressha into orbit and writing a title stating Tokatti will die at sunset, the ToQger uses his photographic memory to sharpen his accuracy and hit the appropriate keys necessary to alter the title and save himself and the Ressha. Type Shadow enlarges himself, but is killed by ToQ-Oh and DieselOh.
Z sends him to test the ToQgers' light and convert the  Station into the  Dark Station, giving most of the ToQgers' amnesia in the process. After ToQ 1gou eventually restores his friends' memories, the ToQgers form Cho ToQ-Oh to kill an enlarged Lamp Shadow.
Loupe Shadow intends to set a city on fire once it is painted black to maximize the damage. However, ToQ 1gou uses the Fire Ressha to save the city while ToQ 2gou, 3gou, and 4gou defeat Loupe Shadow. The Shadow Creep enlarges himself, but is killed by DieselOh Fire.
She sends him to the city of Kiraridai to steal jewels for Miss Glitta's upcoming wedding, during which he unknowingly frames the ToQgers for his thefts. After ToQ 4gou clears his friends' names, the ToQgers defeat Sōjiki Shadow and reclaim the Police Ressha that was in his possession. The Shadow Creep enlarges himself, but is killed by ToQ-Oh Police.
Under Emperor Z's instruction, she sends Hammer Shadow to the  Dark Station to destroy the residents' happiness. However, the Shadow Creep's powers fail to work on ToQ 3gou, which strengthens her imagination and allows her to overpower Hammer Shadow until he is rescued by General Schwarz, who intends to use his abilities in a bid to amass darkness by turning his Cryner into an illusionary dreamworld to lure in children and have them live out their dreams before escorting them to Hammer Shadow to harvest the resulting darkness. Nonetheless, the ToQgers free the children. Hammer Shadow enlarges himself, but is killed by Cho ToQ-Oh.
Ring Shadow terrorizes the inhabitants of the  Dark Station until the ToQgers, joined by ToQ 6gou, defeat him. Ring Shadow enlarges himself, but is killed by ToQ-Oh Drill.
At General Schwarz's suggestion, she sends Fence Shadow to trap the ToQgers' Ressha with a Cryner Robo to put its occupants out of commission. As they were away at the time, ToQ 6gou and 4gou use the newly developed Build Ressha to free their friends before killing the enlarged Fence Shadow with Build DaiOh Drill.
Lacking a sense of humor, the immune ToQ 6gou defeats Jack-in-the-Box Shadow, who enlarges himself before he is killed by ToQ-Oh, DieselOh, and Build DaiOh.
: A soap-themed Shadow Creep and servant of Miss Glitta's who can produce  and  bubbles, the latter of which is capable of switching targets' minds and bodies before eventually killing them. She asks him to use his powers on her and ToQ 3gou so Glitta can avoid her upcoming wedding to Emperor Z, though Sabão Shadow also uses his powers on ToQ 1gou, 2gou, and 4gou, who receive help from ToQ 6ou to defeat the Shadow Creep and undo the switches. Sabão Shadow enlarges himself, but is killed by DieselOh Police Fire and Build DaiOh.
Z tasks him with obtaining light from fairy tale characters at the  Dark Station. After Pinspo Shadow's darkness gets mixed in with the light however, Z loses interest, leading to Baron Nero tasking the Shadow Creep with destroying fairy tale characters in the hopes of producing darkness. After being defeated by ToQ 2gou and Ryo Knight, Pinspo Shadow enlarges himself, but is killed by Build DaiOh Tank and ToQ-Oh Build.
: A namesake-themed Shadow Creep and servant of Baron Nero's who possesses  and believes fighting is outdated. Coin Shadow assumes the guise of a human named  to drive a sentō into bankruptcy and claim the land it is on so he can build a new Shadow Line terminal over a Shadow Pool underneath the bathhouse's foundation. However, ToQ 6gou and 5gou expose and thwart him. Coin Shadow enlarges, but is killed by Cho ToQ-Oh Fire.
After being defeated by Hyper ToQ 4gou and enlarging himself, Bottle Shadow is killed by ToQ-Oh.
She sends him to attack the ToQgers, though he fails to get ToQ 5gou, who was busy baking a birthday cake for ToQ 3gou at the time, while the ToQgers' wigs give birth to chickens that attack Wig Shadow. Taking advantage, the attached Hyper ToQ 5gou and 3gou defeat the Shadow Creep, who enlarges himself before he is killed by Cho Cho ToQ-DaiOh.
: A group of namesake-themed Shadow Creep brothers and servants of Baron Nero's whose powers work best in conjunction with each other. Nero sends them to distract the ToQgers from the Hyper Ressha Terminal, but the brothers are all killed by them.
While enacting Nero's mission, Table Shadow is forced to sacrifice one of his brothers to cover his escape before resuming his attack with his remaining brothers. After being defeated by the ToQgers and enlarging himself, Table Shadow is killed by Hyper Ressha TeiOh alongside his brothers.
: A trio of namesake-themed Shadow Creeps and Table Shadow's younger brothers who are all armed with the  blades, the ability to summon more of their namesakes, and force people to sit down so they can shock them. The first Chair Shadow accompanies Table Shadow on his own, but is betrayed and sacrificed by him. After enlarging, Chair Shadow is killed by Cho ToQ-Oh, which reverts the  Dark Station to the  Station. Following this, the remaining two Chair Shadows join Table Shadow in seeking revenge, only to be defeated by the ToQgers, The Chair Shadows enlarge themselves, but are killed by Hyper Ressha TeiOh alongside Table Shadow.
Despite assuming the guise of a dojo master and leaving behind a decoy of himself, ToQ 1gou and 4gou thwart his scheme. After being defeated by Hyper ToQ 1gou and enlarging himself, Chūshaki Shadow is killed by Hyper Ressha TeiOh.
While converting the  Station into the  Dark Station, Billiard Shadow's actions inadvertently cause a man to fall in love with ToQ 3gou, resulting in a series of events that leads to a frustrated Hyper ToQ 2gou killing the Shadow Creep while taking his aggression out on him.
He is sent to convert the  Station into the  Dark Station and "flunk" the ToQgers when they interfere. After being defeated by Hyper ToQ 4gou and enlarging himself, Mannenhitsu Shadow is killed by ToQ Rainbow.
He is sent to the Touto Film Studio to abduct the cast and crew of the upcoming Police Reporter Pestacore film to produce his masterpiece Yamitto Monster Z and gather as much darkness as possible from its national and overseas releases. After being defeated by the ToQgers and enlarging himself, Film Shadow is killed by ToQ Rainbow.
Due to recklessly overusing his powers, he was deemed a threat to the Shadow Line and imprisoned beneath Castle Terminal. In the present and amidst the Darkness Decline however, Noir releases Boseki Shadow and tasks him with siphoning Castle Terminal's darkness as part of her plan to overthrow Emperor Z. After being defeated by the primary ToQgers and enlarging himself, he is killed by Cho ToQ-Oh Police.
She sends him to confirm ToQ 1gou is causing Emperor Z's light obsession. However, the Shadow Creep is defeated by Hyper ToQ 1gou, trapped in one of his own dollhouses, and killed by Cho Cho ToQ-DaiOh.

Keepers
The  are elite chess-themed Shadow Creeps and servants of Marchioness Mork's who control the Shadow Towns, towns that the Shadow Line has completely taken over and limit the ToQgers' transformation capabilities. Upon their defeat, a Keeper is forced to absorb a Shadow Town's darkness to enlarge themselves, with the town being completely restored following the Keeper's death.

After being defeated by the ToQgers, he absorbs Ugokenai's darkness and his detachment of Close to make himself larger than previous Shadow Creeps until the ToQgers use Cho Cho ToQ-DaiOh to reduce him to the regular giant height before killing him.
: The Keeper of the  Shadow Town, which distorts people's sense of direction to render them permanently lost, who is armed with the  staff, which can fire buzzsaws and fire beams. After being defeated by Hyper ToQ 1gou and enlarging himself, Keeper Bishop is killed by Cho Cho ToQ-DaiOh.
: The Keeper of the  Shadow Town, which he keeps in check by forcing its inhabitants to make impossible choices, who is armed with the spear-like  hobby horse, which he refers to as his "steed" since it enables him to move at superhuman speed. After ToQ 6gou throws Knight Just A Way into orbit, Hyper ToQ 2gou is able to defeat Keeper Knight. The Keeper enlarges himself, but is killed by Hyper Ressha TeiOh and Cho Cho ToQ-DaiOh.
Mork summons him to battle the ToQgers, though Build DaiOh eventually kills him.

Other Shadow Creeps
: A paint-themed Shadow Creep who is capable of firing a beam that removes a target's colors and appears exclusively in the special drama sessions of the series' first original soundtrack. After he converts an unnamed station into the  Dark Station, the ToQgers defeat Enogu Shadow before killing the enlarged Shadow Creep with ToQ-Oh.
After being defeated by the ToQgers via the Galaxy Line Ressha, Hound Shadow fuses with Nair to become Giant Nair Hounder before they are killed by ToQ-Oh and SafariGaOh. Hound Shadow is voiced by KENN.
After being defeated by the ToQgers via the Renketsu Bazooka powered by the Victory Zyudenchi, Clock Shadow is absorbed by Salamazu.
After following Akira when he defected to the Rainbow Line, Tanktop Shadow remained loyal to him until he learned Akira's humanity was slowly killing him. In the hopes of restoring his friend's immortality, Tanktop Shadow helps Archduke Hei turn Akira back into Zaram. Upon realizing the error of his ways, Tanktop Shadow sacrifices himself to save Akira from Hei, but Akira revives him.

Guest characters
: A mole-themed cyborg and member of the Badan Empire. While attempting to bring his compatriots to the surface, he runs afoul of Kamen Rider Gaim and the ToQgers, with the latter destroying him.
: A young adult and member of the dance team, Team Gaim, from Zawame City who is able to become . He and his friends encounter the ToQgers after they make a stop in Zawame City and joins forces with them to stop the Badan Empire. Additionally, he possesses enough imagination to see the Rainbow Line, but not enough to board until Narutaki gives him a Rainbow Pass.
: A friend of Kota's and member of Team Gaim.
: A friend of Kota and Mai's and member of Team Gaim who usually goes by the nickname .
: Mitsuzane's older brother and a project leader in the Yggdrasil Corporation's R&D branch.
: A mysterious individual, self-proclaimed prophet, and enemy of Kamen Rider Decade's who can freely travel through the multiverse. For reasons unknown, he gives Kota a Rainbow Pass and tells him to send the Conductor and Ticket his regards before disappearing.
: An imagination-powered shumai toy from Mio's past known for doing the opposite of any command given to him. While Mio is fighting Hammer Shadow, he manifests a human-sized version of Mikey so the Shadow Creep can destroy him and draw darkness from her heart. Despite succeeding, Mio produces light to dispel the shadows before using the full power of her imagination to defeat Hammer Shadow. Following the battle, she is confident Mikey will be waiting for her once the ToQgers find their hometown. Mikey would later reappear during the events of the crossover film Ressha Sentai ToQger vs. Kyoryuger: The Movie to assist Mio in her, the ToQgers, and Kyoryugers' fight against the Shadow Line and Deboth Army.
: A gallant and dependable superhero that Tokatti drew using his older brother  as inspiration. Amidst the ToQgers' fight with Pinspo Shadow, Ryo Knight comes to life due to the Shadow Creep's powers and assists the ToQgers in fighting him. All the while, Ryo Knight encourages Tokatti not to panic and to take action more often. Ryo Tokashiki himself later appears after the ToQgers return home.

Spin-off exclusive characters
: The conductor of the Galaxy Line, a companion to the Rainbow Line that operates in space and uses the Safari Ressha, who first appears in the film Ressha Sentai ToQger the Movie: Galaxy Line S.O.S..
: Lady's hand puppet assistant, akin to Ticket, who appears exclusively in the film Ressha Sentai ToQger the Movie: Galaxy Line S.O.S. Passko is voiced by M·A·O.
Nevertheless, he is killed by ToQ-Oh and SafariGaOh.
: A hand puppet worn by General Schwarz and nemesis of Ticket's who appears exclusively in Ressha Sentai ToQger DVD Special: Farewell, Ticket! The Wasteland Super ToQ Battle!!. After killing Ticket's girlfriend, Jennifer, Kaniros resurfaces in the present to kill Ticket, only to be killed in battle by him. Kaniros is voiced by Tomokazu Seki.
After being exiled from the Shadow Line sometime prior for attempting to take over, Hei resurfaces following Emperor Z's defeat to assume full leadership. While he is defeated by the ToQgers, Hei fakes his death and plots revenge, hoping to strike back once they become adults. However, a time paradox created by Miss Glitta allows the adult ToQgers to regain their imagination and join forces with Akira, Conductor, and their childhood selves to kill Hei.
: A mad scientist for the Shadow Line and ninja fanatic who can create  of legendary ninja and appears exclusively in the crossover film Shuriken Sentai Ninninger vs. ToQger the Movie: Ninja in Wonderland. After stealing Takaharu Igasaki's Nintality, Mavro creates  to serve him.

Notes

References

Ressha Sentai ToQger